Lottia gigantea, common name the owl limpet, is a species of sea snail, a true limpet, a marine gastropod mollusc in the family Lottiidae. Its genome has been sequenced at the Joint Genome Institute.

Distribution
The owl limpet is found on the Pacific coast of North America from northern California to southern Baja California.

Description
The owl limpet grows to a length of up to nine centimetres. The often much eroded shell has an elongated low cone shape with the apex close to one end. The anterior slope is concave. The general colour is brownish grey with pale markings and the foot is pale grey with a yellow or orange sole. There is also a small form that lives on the shells of mussels. It is even more elongated, up to twenty-five millimetres long, and dark blue with concentric growth rings. Lottia gigantea present a muscular orange foot.

Round the edge of the foot the owl limpet has a distinctive pallial gill system which uses currents caused by the beating of cilia to circulate water over the gills when submerged.

Ecology

Habitat 

It is most abundant in California and favours vertical rock faces in wave-swept areas in the upper littoral zone. It grows slowly and may live for up to twenty years. It browses on microalgae growing on rock surfaces.

The owl limpet is a territorial species and some individuals return to the same specific homesite every time the tide goes out. The limpet's contours grow to fit the homesite rock surface tightly.

Life cycle
Owl limpets are protandric hermaphrodites. They spend about two years as juveniles before starting their reproductive lives as male limpets. If they survive long enough, some of them later transform into females. Spawning takes place once a year in the winter. The larvae are pelagic and form part of the zooplankton. They may be transported large distances by currents before settling on suitable rock surfaces.

Larger individuals will themselves have encrusting animals such as barnacles and algae growing on their shells. Sometimes the shell will be used by other limpets or chitons for grazing on the microalgae that grows there. The black oystercatcher, Haematopus bachmani is the only known predator of the owl limpet but they are also harvested by humans for food.

Feeding habits

Large female limpets graze on the film of algae growing on rocks and defend their territory against other owl limpets, mobile gastropods, mussels, sea anemones, barnacles and macroalgae. Large competitors are dislodged by pushing them away with the anterior part of the shell, and if barnacles settle, they are rasped away with the radula. In this way, each individual maintains a territory of about 900 square centimetres. It selectively grazes its algal meadow maintaining a turf depth of at least one millimetre. In spring and summer, these green meadows are visible from fifteen metres away and if the owl limpet is transplanted to a new area, it establishes a new meadow over the course of about three weeks.<ref>Stimpson J. (1973). "The role of territory on the ecology of the intertidal limpet, Lottia gigantea". Ecology 54: 1020-1030.</ref>

References

 Further reading 
 Fenberg P.B. & Rivadeneira M.M. (2011). "Range limits and geographic patterns of abundance of the rocky intertidal owl limpet, Lottia gigantea. Journal of Biogeography 38: 2286-2298
 Fenberg P.B. & Roy K (2012). "Anthropogenic harvesting pressure and changes in life history: insights from a rocky intertidal limpet". The American Naturalist 180: 200-210
 Fenberg P.B. (2013). "Intraspecific home range scaling: a case study from the owl limpet (Lottia gigantea)". Evolutionary Ecology Research: 15: 103-110
 Fenberg P.B., Hellberg M.E., Mullen L., & Roy K (2010). "Genetic diversity and population structure of the size-selectively harvested owl limpet, Lottia gigantea"
 Denny M. W. & Blanchette C. A. (2000). "Hydrodynamics, shell shape, behavior and survivorship in the owl limpet Lottia gigantea". Journal of Experimental Biology 203(17): 2623-2639. abstract, PDF
 Fisher W. K. (1904). "The anatomy of Lottia gigantea Gray". Zoologische Jahrbücher. Abteilung für Anatomie und Ontogenie der Tiere'' 20: 1-66.

External links 

 Lottia gigantea: Natural History Museum
 Wallawalla university info
 

Lottiidae
Gastropods described in 1834
Taxa named by George Brettingham Sowerby I